The 2011 World Youth Baseball Championship was an under-16 international baseball competition held in Lagos de Moreno, Mexico from August 19 to August 28, 2011. This event is considered a test event for the 2011 Pan American Games baseball event.

Teams
Eleven teams participated in the tournament. Originally, the Philippines would appear in Group A, but the team withdrew one week before the tournament.

 
 Chinese Taipei is the official IBAF designation for the team representing the state officially referred to as the Republic of China, more commonly known as Taiwan. (See also political status of Taiwan for details.)

Round 1

Group A

Standings

Schedule and Results

Group B

Standings

Schedule and Results

 
 The team from Cuba did not arrive in time in Mexico for the tournament and lost their first game due to forfeit, which was scheduled against the Netherlands.

 The team from the Dominican Republic did not arrive in Mexico and lost all their games due to forfeit.

Round 2

Group C

Standings

Schedule and Results

Group D

Standings

Schedule and Results

Round 3

Bronze medal game

Gold medal game

Final standings

References

U-15 Baseball World Cup
World Youth Baseball Championship
World Youth Baseball Championship
World Youth Baseball Championship
2011
World Youth Baseball Championship